Francis Russell (January 12, 1910 in Boston, Massachusetts – March 20, 1989 in Falmouth, Massachusetts) was an American author specializing in American history and historical figures. Russell is best known for his book on Warren G. Harding, The Shadow of Blooming Grove. He graduated from Bowdoin College, and from Harvard University, with a master's degree in 1937.
He served in the Canadian Army from 1941 to 1946.

He married Rosalind Lawson.  He had a daughter from a previous marriage.

His papers are kept at Bowdoin College.

Russell became embroiled in a lawsuit with some of the heirs of Warren Harding around the publication of his 1968 biography of the former president.  Alleging that they had been embarrassed by the previous publication of some of the love letters of Harding, the heirs sued and won a judgement preventing the publication of the letters by Russell.

His work on the Sacco-Vanzetti case, the award-winning Tragedy In Dedham: The Story of the Sacco-Vanzetti Case (1962), continued with the 1986 publication of Sacco & Vanzetti: The Case Resolved.  In it, he claimed to solve the case, proposing that  only Nicola Sacco was guilty and Bartholomew Vanzetti was innocent.

Awards
 1963 Edgar Award for Best Fact Crime book, for Tragedy In Dedham : The Story of the Sacco-Vanzetti Case
 1964 Guggenheim Fellowship

Works
Tragedy In Dedham : The Story of the Sacco-Vanzetti Case, McGraw-Hill, 1962
Lexington, Concord and Bunker Hill (with the Editors of American Heritage) (1963)
The Great Interlude (1964)
The Shadow of Blooming Grove (published in the UK as President Harding: His Life and Times 1866-1923) (1968)
The Horizon Concise History of Germany (1973)
Adams: An American Dynasty, American Heritage Pub. Co., 1976, ; reprint Castle Books, 2005, 
A City in Terror: 1919, the Boston Police Strike, Viking Press, 1975, ; reprint, Beacon Press, 2005, 
The President Makers: From Mark Hanna to Joseph P. Kennedy (1976)
Sacco & Vanzetti: The Case Resolved (1986)
The Knave of Boston & Other Ambiguous Massachusetts Characters (1987)

References

External links
 President Makers from Mark Hanna to Joseph Patrick Kennedy Manuscript at Dartmouth College Library

1910 births
1989 deaths
Warren G. Harding
Bowdoin College alumni
Edgar Award winners
Harvard University alumni
Canadian military personnel of World War II
20th-century American writers